AAUP may refer to:

American Association of University Professors, an organization of professors and other academics
Association of University Presses, an association of mostly North American university presses